The Christmas Blessing is a 2005 American-Canadian made-for-television romantic drama film directed by Karen Arthur which was broadcast on CBS on December 18, 2005. It also featured songs by country artist Blake Shelton, including the hit "Nobody But Me", and "The Christmas Blessing" by Newsong.  It is the second part in a trilogy of films, preceded by  The Christmas Shoes (2002) and followed by The Christmas Hope (2009).

Plot
When Nathan (Neil Patrick Harris), a doctor, loses a patient on the operating table, he decides that being a doctor isn't meant for him, and he wants to give it up.  He decides to take a vacation to his hometown, and stay with his father (Hugh Thompson).

While volunteering at the local grade school, he meets Charlie (Angus T. Jones), a young boy who has also lost his mother, and Meghan (Rebecca Gayheart), Charlie's teacher.  Charlie and his father have also just arrived in town, to work at estates doing chores.  Nathan, searching for the shoes he gave his mother the Christmas she died (Even though in the "17 years later" epilogue of The Christmas Shoes he left them on her grave and walked away), learns that Charlie now has them.  And Meghan, wanting to buy a house for those in need, may not be able to.

Soon after his arrival, Nathan learns that Charlie is ailing from an irregular heart defect, and Meghan has cirrhosis of the liver, and will die unless she has a transplant. In the end, it is Charlie who saves her life, by giving her his liver.  As a dying wish, he asks Nathan, whom he calls coach, to give her the shoes. And Robert (Rob Lowe), Meghan's friend, buys the house for her. In honor of Charlie, Meghan names the house after him.

Selected cast

Reception
CineMagazine rated the film 3 stars.

See also 
 List of Christmas films

References

External links

2005 television films
2005 films
2005 romantic drama films
2000s Christmas drama films
American television films
American romantic drama films
American Christmas drama films
Canadian Christmas films
Christmas television films
English-language Canadian films
Films shot in Edmonton
Television sequel films
Films directed by Karen Arthur
2000s American films